Kevin Morgan may refer to:

 Kevin Morgan (politician) (1921–2003), Australian politician
 Kevin Morgan (cyclist) (born 1948), Australian Olympic cyclist
 Kevin Morgan (baseball) (born 1969), former Major League Baseball player and current executive
 Kevin Morgan (rugby union) (born 1977), Welsh rugby union player